Mizo Zirlai Pawl (lit. Mizo students' Association) is a Mizo multinational student organization and apex students body in Mizoram state. Established on 27 October 1935 in Shillong by Mizo earlier educated students. Originally as the Lushai Students Association (LSA), which was later replaced with the "Mizo Zirlai Pawl" (Mizo Students Association) on 1 September 1946. As Mizoram State government notified MZP raising day 27 October was observed as "Zirlaite Ni" (Students' Day) from 2008 in Mizoram. It was registered as SR No. 35 of 1969–70 under Indian Societies Registration Act. Its general headquarters is in the state capital of Mizoram, Aizawl. And it has 12 headquarters inside and outside of Mizoram state, such as Churachandpur (in Manipur), Behliangchhip (in Tripura), and in Mizoram state - Serchhip, Biate, Champhai, Darlawn, Kolasib, Mamit, Zawlnuam, Saitual, Lunglei and Khawzawl. It has 50 Sub-Headquarters and many branches.

Scope
The following Mizo (used as an umbrella term for all peoples who speak one of the Mizo languages) student organizations are affiliated to it:
Lai Students' Association (LSA)
Mizoram Bawm Students' Association (MBSA)
Pang zirlai Pawl (PZP)
Mara Students' Organization (MSO)
Ranglong Students' Union (RSU)
Thado-Kuki Students' Union (TKSU)
Siamsinpawlpi (SSPP)

It is itself a constituent unit of North-East Students' Organisation (NESO)

Most of College Students Union in Mizoram, Women Politechnic, Aizawl and Mizoram University Students Council; Chairman/Vice President and General Secretary is the Ex-Officio Member in General Headquarters.

In different parts of India, Cities and Institution based Mizo Students Association is also affiliated to Mizo Zirlai Pawl; like, Mizo Students Union Pune (MSUP), Delhi Mizo Zirlai Pawl (DMZP) and many more.

History
The Lushai Students Association previously founded in 1926 at Shillong and which had almost collapsed was revived in October 1935. Its main objectives were to look after the welfare of the Lushai Students, to prepare them to become leaders of future, and to preserve the Lushai traditional and cultural values. At the first general elections held on 24 October 1939, Buchhawn was elected as its president, Lalhmuaka as its general secretary, Hrawva as its treasurer and Saptea as its student secretary. The general meeting at Aizawl on 1 September 1946 had changed its name into Mizo Zirlai Pawl (MZP) and shifted its base from Shillong to Aizawl.

The association was established on 27 October 1935.

Aims and objectives

The motto is Ṭanrual hi chakna (lit. Unity is strength) and the theme (thuvawn) is Mizo students in service of Mizo Nation (Mizo zirlaite kan ram leh hnam tan). Its main aim is 'to prepare all Zohnahthlâk people to be valuable citizens for the Mizo nation and Zoram ' and 'to help the government in the development of Zoram and Mizo nation'. The following are some of the main aims and objectives:
 to safeguard the rights and unity of all Mizo students
 to prepare Mizo people to become helpful citizens of Zoram
 to do its best to unite all Mizo people and create an independent Mizo state out of all the territories historically occupied by Mizo peoples
 to prevent and attack corruption in Mizoram
 to conserve traditional Mizo values.

Functions

[[File:Zofate Run, Farkawn.JPG|thumb|right|MZP Assembly 2014 pandal Zofate Run' at Farkawn, Mizoram]]

The association is administered by the General Headquarters, which constitutes six elected office bearers elected by an electoral college after every two years, and who in turn appoint not more than fifty executive committee members for a term of 1 year. Ten appointed secretaries are selected among the executive committee members who take charge of various posts to advice and assist the elected office bearer. And then, they run the office and activities actively.

The executive committee appoints the adviser and NESO Council member for one year. Various subcommittees and clubs are also formed in the general headquarters.
The following are the elected office bearers for the term 2019–2021-
 President        – Lalnunmawia Pautu. Vice president    – Andrew F.Lalramnghaka General secretary – Jacob Lalmuanpuia Assistant Secretary   – Chinkhanmang Thomte Treasurer         – Sanghmingthanga Finance Secretary – Lalhuapliana''

At present Mr. Ricky Lalbiakmawia (finance secretary) represents MZP in the NESO committee.
MZP Assembly is the top authority in the association, and Federal Council Sitting is the second highest authority to rule the association.

Presidents of the organisation

|-
|2021-2023
|Lalnunmawia Pautu

Publication

Mizo Zirlai Pawl publishes a monthly magazine MZP CHANCHINBU in Mizo language since 1938. It has a circulation of 1,000 copies. It registered under Registrar of Newspapers for India

It also published the followings-
 Zoram map, prepared by- L.Malsawma Colney in 2006
 Zofest 2006 Souvenir
 Zofest 2008 Souvenir 'CHIBAI'
 MZP Platinum Jubilee Souvenir, in 2010
 Zofest 2012 Souvenir 'Insuihkhawn'
 Zofest 2014 Souvenir 'Unau kan ni'
 MZP Calendar, annual

See Also
 Akhil Bharatiya Vidyarthi Parishad

References

Mizoram